Year 1266 (MCCLXVI) was a common year starting on Friday (link will display the full calendar) of the Julian calendar.

Events 
 By place 
 Europe 
 January 2 – Siege of Murcia: King James I of Aragon (the Conqueror) marches with his army from Orihuela and lays siege at Murcia on the Segura River. Skirmishes break out between the defenders and the Aragonese forces. The Muslim garrison, realizing that they are outnumbered and cut off from reinforcements, asks for terms. James offers to ask King Alfonso X of Castile (the Wise) to restore the Murcians' legal rights (see 1244) from before the rebellion: self-government under Castilian suzerainty, freedom of worship, and preservation of lands and properties. They agree to this offer but request Alfonso's explicit agreement rather than just James' promise to ask him. James refuses to get Alfonso's agreement before the city surrenders. Finally, the Moors yield Murcia to James on January 31. Seeing his standard on the walls, James enters the city on February 3, accepting its surrender.
 February 26 – Battle of Benevento: Guelph forces (some 12,000 men), led by Charles of Anjou, brother of King Louis IX (the Saint), defeat a combined German and Sicilian army under King Manfred of Sicily, during a long-running power struggle in Italy. Manfred takes up a strong position near Benevento. As the French infantry advances, he unleashes his Saracen archers and light cavalry, which scatters the French. But the Saracens leave themselves exposed to the French heavy cavalry, and are overwhelmed. Manfred orders his heavy cavalry (some 1,200 German mercenary knights) into the attack, but they are defeated by the Ghibelline forces, and take heavy losses. Manfred is killed, and Pope Clement IV invests Charles as ruler of Sicily and Naples. Meanwhile, Michael II, despot of Epirus, invades Albania, and recovers the lands that Manfred has taken from him.
 June – The Mudéjar Revolt ends. The rebels make their formal submission to Alfonso X (the Wise). They recognize the error that the Moors of Murcia have committed against their overlord Alfonso. Representatives of the aljama, or municipal council, renew their allegiance and humbly beg for pardon, mercy and favour. With this, the Mudéjar uprising in the Kingdom of Murcia is formally ended.
 June 23 – Battle of Trapani: The Venetian fleet (24 galleys) led by Admiral Jacopo Dondulo moves to Marsala and attacks the larger Genoese fleet anchored at Trapani, capturing all its ships. Some 1,200 Genoese drown and many are killed. Dondulo is acclaimed a hero on his return to Venice in July. He is elected as Captain General of the Sea, Venice's highest naval command position.
 July 2 – Treaty of Perth: King Alexander III agrees to a peace settlement with King Magnus VI (the Law-mender) in which the Outer Hebrides and Isle of Man are ceded to Scotland in exchange for 4,000 marks. In return, Alexander confirms Norwegian sovereignty over the islands of Shetland and Orkney.

 England 
 May 15 – Battle of Chesterfield: English forces led by Henry of Almain, son of Richard of Cornwall, defeat the rebels under Robert de Ferrers at Chesterfield. Robert is taken as a prisoner to London, and at the Parliament of England disinherits. In July, he is forced to surrender land and Liverpool Castle to Edmund, second son of King Henry III.
 October – The Second Barons' War winds down, as supporters of the rebel leader Simon de Montfort make an offer of peace to Henry III, in the Dictum of Kenilworth; after slight modifications to the peace settlement.
 December 13 – Siege of Kenilworth: English forces under Henry III capture Kenilworth Castle after a 6-month siege. During the siege Archbishop William Freney tries to negotiate with the garrison but is refused entry.

 Levant 
 July 23 – Siege of Safed: Mamluk forces capture the castle of Safed, defended by a garrison of 1,700 men (including some 500 Knights Templar), after a 6-week siege. Sultan Baibars promises safe conduct but when the Christians and Templars are on their way towards Acre, they are seized and beheaded.
 August 24 – Battle of Mari: Mamluk forces (some 30,000 men) led by Baibars defeat the Armenian army in Cilicia, in retaliation for the support of the Mongol invasion in Syria. He expands his domain, capturing the city of Byblos (modern Lebanon) and the important castle of Toron from the Crusader States.
 October 28 – A Crusader advance guard is ambushed by the Egyptian garrison of Safed, while local Arabs attack the Crusader camp. The 13-year-old Hugh II, ruler of Cyprus, is advised to retire and withdraw with heavy losses. Meanwhile, Baibars campaigns in Galilee and leads a lightning raid to Tripoli. 

 Asia 
 Niccolo and Maffeo Polo, father and uncle of Marco Polo, reach the Mongol capital Khanbaliq (modern-day Beijing], setting the stage for Marco's famous expedition 5 years later. Kublai Khan sends the Polos back with a message, requesting that Clement IV dispatch western scholars to teach in the Mongol Empire; however, this request is largely ignored.

 America 
In the modern-day United States, a period of drought begins in the Four Corners Region (this period is up until the year 1299), putting an end to the ancient Puebloans Civilization.

 By topic 

 Economics 
 In France, the gold écu (or crown) and silver grosh coins are minted for the first time during the reign of Louis IX (the Saint).

 Religion 
 Ode de Pougy, French Abbess of Notre Dame aux Nonnains, sends a gang to attempt to destroy the nearly completed Church of St. Urbain de Troyes.

Births 
 Duns Scotus, Scottish priest and philosopher (d. 1308)
 Gi Ja-oh (or Ki Ja-oh), Korean nobleman (d. 1328)
 Gilbert Segrave, English nobleman and bishop (d. 1316)
 Herman VII (the Rouser), German nobleman (d. 1291)
 Hethum II (or Het'um), king of Cilician Armenia (d. 1307)
 Jadwiga of Kalisz, queen consort of Poland (d. 1339)
 John of Brittany, English nobleman and knight (d. 1334)
 Margaret of Villehardouin, princess of Achaea (d. 1315)
 Ravivarman Kulaśēkhara, Indian ruler of Venad (d. 1317)
 Rigdzin Kumaradza, Tibetan Dzogchen master (d. 1343)

Deaths 
 January 2 – Simon de Walton, English cleric and bishop
 January 11 – Swietopelk II (the Great), Polish nobleman
 February 12 – Walter de Cantilupe, English bishop (b. 1195)
 February 26
 Manfred, illegitimate son of Frederick II (b. 1232)
 Richard of Lauria, Italian nobleman and condottiere
 April 14 – Roger of Torre Maggiore, Italian archbishop 
 May 7 – Fariduddin Ganjshakar, Ghurid preacher (b. 1179)
 May 27 – Elisabeth of Brunswick, German queen (b. 1230)
 June 12 – Henry II, German nobleman and prince (b. 1215)
 July 24 – Albrecht II of Meissen, German canon and bishop
 August 4 – Odo of Burgundy (or Eudes), French nobleman 
 August 8 – Sayyed ibn Tawus, Abbasid theologian (b. 1193)
 September 20 – Jan Prandota, bishop of Kraków (b. 1200)
 October 21 – Birger Jarl, Swedish nobleman and knight (b. 1210)
 October 28 – Arsenije Sremac, Serbian disciple and archbishop 
 October 29 – Margaret of Austria, queen of Germany (b. 1204)
 November 19 – Nasir al-Din Mahmud, Mamluk ruler of Delhi
 December 3 – Henry III (the White), duke of Silesia-Wrocław
 Aldonza Alfonso de León, illegitimate daughter of Alfonso IX
 Andronikos II (Megas Komnenos), emperor of Trebizond
 Ariq Böke (or Bukha), Mongol ruler (khagan) and regent
 Berke Khan, Mongol ruler of the Golden Horde (b. 1208)
 Chen Rong, Chinese painter, poet and politician (b. 1200)
 Hugh Bigod, English nobleman and chief justiciar (b. 1211)
 Hugh III of Chalon, French nobleman and knight (b. 1220)
 John of Ibelin, Outremer nobleman and knight (b. 1215)
 Luca Savelli, Italian senator and politician (b. 1190)
 Máel Coluim II (or Malcolm II), Scottish nobleman
 Margaret de Quincy, English noblewoman and heiress
 Mu'ayyad al-Din al-Urdi, Syrian scholar and astronomer
 Philippe Chinard, French nobleman and admiral (b. 1205)
 Richer of Senones, French monk and chronicler (b. 1190)

References